Zachariah is an unincorporated community in Wolfe County, Kentucky, United States. Its post office  is closed.

References

Unincorporated communities in Wolfe County, Kentucky
Unincorporated communities in Kentucky